Francis Joseph Christopher Skeffington (later Sheehy Skeffington; 23 December 1878 – 26 April 1916) was an Irish writer and radical activist, known also by the nickname "Skeffy". He was a friend and schoolmate of James Joyce (and the real-life model for a character in Joyce's novel A Portrait of the Artist as a Young Man), Oliver St. John Gogarty, Tom Kettle, and Frank O'Brien (the father of Conor Cruise O'Brien). When he married Hanna Sheehy in 1903, he adopted her surname as part of his own, resulting in the name "Sheehy Skeffington". They always spelled their joined names unhyphenated, although many sources add the hyphen.

Early life
Francis Skeffington was descended from Sir William Skeffington (1465-1535), who ruled Ireland in the early 16th century as Lord Deputy of king Henry VIII. Francis was born in Bailieborough, County Cavan, and was raised in Downpatrick, County Down, the only son of Dr. Joseph Bartholomew Skeffington (c.1850-1919), an inspector of National Schools, and his wife Rose, née Magorrian (c.1834-1909). Joseph and Rose were married in 1869 at the Roman Catholic Chapel at Ballykinlar, County Down. 

Francis (known in childhood as "Frank") was educated initially at home by his father, and later at the Jesuit school in St Stephen's Green, Dublin. He manifested an early sympathy for radical politics, as attested by his enthusiasm for the constructed language Esperanto. In 1893, at the age of 15, he wrote a letter to his local newspaper in County Down stating that "Gaelic" was irretrievably dead and "the study of Esperanto would be more useful to the youth of Ireland". Later in life he became fluent in the language, and had a number of Esperanto books in his library when he died. This enthusiasm was not unusual at the time in leftist circles, and several prominent leaders of the 1916 Easter rising, including James Connolly, were also Esperantists.

Student years
In 1896 (aged 17), he enrolled in University College, then run by the Jesuits and located on St Stephen's Green in the centre of Dublin. He stayed at the college long enough to earn a master's degree. Skeffington was a well-known figure at the college, individualistic and unconventional in temperament. He was active in student politics and debating societies, including the Literary and Historical Society, which he revived in 1897.

His closest companions in his student days were James Joyce and Thomas Kettle (the latter later became his brother-in-law). In protest against uniformity of dress, Skeffington refused to shave, and wore knickerbockers with long socks, which earned him the nickname "Knickerbockers". He was an ardent proponent of women's rights, and wore a Votes for Women badge. He was an equally ardent advocate of pacifism and vegetarianism, and he denounced smoking, drinking, and vivisection. He was a vegetarian and a teetotaller. But he did permit himself chocolate, and apparently he was often seen with a bar of milk chocolate in his pocket.

Joyce enrolled at University College in 1898; he was four years Skeffington's junior but only two classes below him. A number of Joyce's early writings known as "epiphanies", composed in 1901-02, are set in Hanna Sheehy's house and one includes Skeffington among those present. Joyce left a fictional portrait of Skeffington in his novel A Portrait of the Artist as a Young Man, under the guise of "MacCann", a fellow-student whom Joyce's alter-ego Stephen Dedalus describes as "a squat figure in a shooting jacket and breeches," with a "bluntfeatured face" and "a strawcolored goatee which hung from his blunt chin." Stephen remembers him saying: "Dedalus, you're an anti-social being, wrapped up in yourself. I'm not. I'm a democrat: and I'll work and act for social liberty and equality among all classes and sexes in the United States of the Europe of the future." Later, "MacCann" is seen standing in a lobby after class, canvassing signatures on a petition for universal peace, under a picture of the Czar of Russia, who was a proponent of disarmament. (In the spring term of that year Skeffington would attend the international peace conference called by the Czar.) "MacCann began to speak with fluent energy of the Czar's rescript, of Stead, of general disarmament, arbitration in cases of international disputes, of the signs of the times, of the new humanity and the new gospel of life which would make it the business of the community to secure as cheaply as possible the greatest possible happiness of the greatest possible number." – Stephen Dedalus expresses indifference to these goals and gestures at the picture of the Czar: "If we must have a Jesus, let us have a legitimate Jesus." To which MacCann replies: "Dedalus, I believe you're a good fellow, but you have yet to learn the dignity of altruism and the responsibility of the human individual."

Writing to his brother Stanislaus about the above passages, Joyce referred to Skeffington as "Hairy Jaysus", a comic expression which is both sardonic and affectionate.

In the autumn of 1901 Skeffington wrote an essay advocating equal status for women in the University, commissioned by St Stephen's, the new literary magazine of the college.

The essay was refused publication by the Censor, and, at Joyce's suggestion, Skeffington then published the essay as a pamphlet, along with another essay by Joyce himself, which had been similarly censored ("The Day of the Rabblement", a critique of the Irish Literary Theatre). Although Joyce and Skeffington disagreed with each other's politics, they both resented censorship, and agreed to co-finance the print run of 85 copies and distribute the pamphlet to newspapers and prominent Dubliners.

Marriage and political career

After graduating from University College, Skeffington worked as a freelance journalist, contributing to socialist and pacifist publications in Ireland, England, France and North America. In 1901-02 he taught in St Kieran's College in Kilkenny, where he was a colleague and friend of the school's English, French and history master Thomas MacDonagh; the two also lodged in the same house in Kilkenny City. He then took a job as the Registrar of University College.

On 26 June 1903 he married Hanna Sheehy, a teacher at the Rathmines College of Commerce (a forerunner of Dublin Institute of Technology). They jointly adopted the surname "Sheehy Skeffington". Hanna's family were a prosperous farming and milling family in County Cork. Her father had been a Nationalist MP, and had been imprisoned no less than six times for revolutionary activities.

The couple joined the Irish Women's Suffrage and Local Government Association, and the Young Ireland Branch of the United Irish League (the constituency element of the Irish Parliamentary Party). They also supported the Women's Social and Political Union, which lobbied for women's rights in Britain. Shortly after they married, Francis organised a petition to lobby for women to be admitted to University College on the same basis as men. When the university refused to take that step, Francis resigned from his job as registrar in protest, relying on Hanna to support him for a time. He was President of the Socialist Party of Ireland.

In 1907, Francis wrote a novel, In Dark and Evil Days, which was published posthumously in 1916, the year of his death.

In 1908, he published a biography of the Irish nationalist and Land League agitator Michael Davitt.

In 1912, he and Hanna co-founded the Irish Women's Franchise League. He was made co-editor of the League's newspaper, The Irish Citizen. The Irish Women's Franchise League agitated for votes for women; members included his brother-in-law Tom Kettle and his friend Thomas MacDonagh, as well as all of the non-nationalist suffrage activists of the day. (Nationalist women tended to avoid it, on the basis that the IWFL was seeking to get into the British Parliament, while nationalists were trying to get out).

In 1909 Francis and Hanna had a son, Owen. They were much criticised for refusing to have him baptised.

In April 1911, Francis took part in an amusing protest at a meeting of the Dublin Chamber of Commerce. The chamber was holding a public meeting to organise a welcoming ceremony for King George V on his visit to Dublin later that year. To open the meeting, the president of the chamber proposed that "a Citizens' Committee be formed for the purpose of arranging a suitable welcome and preparing and presenting a loyal address to the Most Gracious Majesties the King and Queen, on their approaching visit to Dublin". Francis counter-proposed that the word "not" be inserted after the words "be formed", and argued that ignoring the visit was the best compromise to satisfy both supporters and objectors to the visit. "Sean Milroy – a future minister in the Irish Free State – stood to second Sheehy Skeffington's motion, while the chairman, the Earl of Mayo, attempted to maintain order over cries of 'Hear hear!' and 'Put him out!' In an effort to silence the dissenters, Mayo called a vote on Sheehy Skeffington's amendment; 36 supported it while 'some hundreds' voted against." After this, Countess Markievicz proposed another counter-resolution which led to further uproar.

Francis was on friendly terms with Countess Markievicz: for instance he once escorted her to a police court after she had kicked a police officer during a Socialist Party meeting, which Francis had also attended.

During the 1913 Dublin Lock-out, he became involved in the Citizens' Peace Committee, a group formed by various people including Tom Kettle and Thomas MacDonagh, with Joseph Plunkett as secretary, whose goal was to reconcile the employers and workers. The workers were willing to negotiate, but not the employers.

Francis Sheehy Skeffington joined and then became a vice-chairman of the Irish Citizen Army when it was established in response to the lockout. But he lent his support on the understanding that the ICA would have a strictly defensive role; he resigned when it became a military entity.

Sheehy Skeffington testified before a tribunal in 1913 as a witness to the arrest of the leading trade unionist Jim Larkin on O'Connell Street, and the subsequent police assault against a peaceful crowd, which had occurred on the last weekend of August 1913. His testimony stated that he was in the street with a group of women caring for a person who had already been assaulted by the police when a member of the Dublin Metropolitan Police charged towards this group with his baton raised. He reports that it was only because he called out the policeman's number that the man was dissuaded from the violence he had so clearly intended. He said that he was later abused by a gang of policemen showing clear signs of intoxication in the yard of the police station at College Green where he went to make his complaint, and that their officers had no control over their behaviour.

In 1914, on the outbreak of World War I, Sheehy Skeffington campaigned against recruitment and was jailed for six months.

He supported the peace crusade of the American car manufacturer Henry Ford; and when Countess Markievicz advocated armed uprising by Irish nationalists, he challenged her to a debate on the subject. She accepted the challenge in an open letter published in James Connolly's newspaper, The Workers' Republic.

Easter Rising 
Francis Sheehy Skeffington is often considered one of the martyrs of Ireland's 1916 Easter Rising. In his biography of James Joyce, Richard Ellmann wrote that Sheehy Skeffington "died at the hands of the British ... when he quixotically tried to dissuade the Dublin poor from looting".  But Sheehy Skeffington's death can be more accurately explained as a consequence of Dublin Castle's suspicion that he was a Sinn Fein conspirator and Captain John Bowen-Colthurst's violent hostility towards any and all suspected rebel sympathisers.  Timothy Healy's opinion was that Sheehy-Skeffington was shot because he was a witness to Bowen-Colthurst's murder of James Coade.

Political background
Francis Sheehy Skeffington had always supported Home Rule for Ireland. After 1913 he had also supported his friend Thomas MacDonagh's more separatist Irish Volunteers; however he grew increasingly critical of the Volunteers' growing militarism, and in an open letter to MacDonagh published in 1915 in his own paper The Irish Citizen, Sheehy Skeffington wrote: "As you know, I am personally in full sympathy with the fundamental objects of the Irish Volunteers ... [however,] as your infant movement grows, towards the stature of a full-grown militarism, its essence – preparation to kill – grows more repellent to me."

At the outset of the Easter Rising, Sheehy Skeffington opposed the violent methods of the insurgents, advocating a nonviolent form of civil disobedience, while his wife Hanna actively sympathised with the insurgents and joined the group of women who brought food to those stationed at the General Post Office and the Royal College of Surgeons. In contrast, on the first day of the rising (Monday 24 April 1916) Francis risked crossfire to go to the aid of an English soldier outside Dublin Castle. As Hanna recalled the incident six years later: "When the outbreak began on Easter Monday my husband was near Dublin Castle. He learned that a British officer had been gravely wounded and was bleeding to death on the cobblestones outside the Castle gate. My husband persuaded a bystander to go with him to the rescue. Together they ran across the square under a hail of fire. Before they reached the spot, however, some British troops rushed out and dragged the wounded man to cover inside the gate."

Attempts to prevent looting
Shortly after that incident Sheehy Skeffington was seen climbing up onto the steps of Nelson's Pillar on Sackville Street, and haranguing a crowd of inner-city paupers to stop looting shops. He was hooted and jeered, and his next move was then to cross the street, enter the GPO, and demand to speak to James Connolly, one of the principal leaders of the insurrection, who was also a labour leader and sympathetic to Sheehy Skeffington's socialism. Connolly sent out some armed men to quell the looting. The men climbed an overturned tramcar to berate the looters, and even fired shots over the looters' heads.

The next morning, 25 April, Sheehy Skeffington went back into the city centre and, again according to Hanna, "actively interested himself in preventing looting". He returned to the GPO, emerging around one o'clock, and began to walk around the area pasting up a typewritten flyer. The flyer read:

When there are no regular police in the streets, it becomes the duty of citizens to police the streets themselves and to prevent such spasmodic looting as has been taking place in a few streets. Civilians (men and women) who are willing to co-operate to this end are asked to attend at Westmoreland Chambers (over Eden Bros.) at five o'clock this (Tues.) afternoon.

Sheehy Skeffington then busied himself visiting various people, including priests, to enlist their help in guarding specific shops. That afternoon he had tea with his wife Hanna in one of the tea shops which, astonishingly, were still open in the city centre. Hanna then returned home to mind their child Owen, and Francis went to his meeting. Unfortunately the meeting was poorly attended, and no one volunteered to help Francis stop the looting.

Arrest
On his way home from the dispiriting meeting, Francis was followed by a crowd of hecklers who were shouting out his nickname, "Skeffy!" This crowd of hecklers turned out to be a crucial cog in the machinery of fate which was to bring on his death. Undoubtedly they were the very inner city poor whom he had been exhorting to refrain from looting – and who would have been familiar with him from his many impromptu speeches on the steps of the Custom House, where he exhorted the passers-by on feminist or socialist subjects.
He lived at that time at 11 (now 21) Grosvenor Place in Rathmines, and as he and his hecklers approached the Portobello Bridge, around 7:30 p.m., they were intercepted by soldiers of the 11th East Surrey Regiment. The officer in charge was under orders to keep the road and bridge clear, and felt apprehensive about the disorderly crowd. He detained Sheehy Skeffington, who said that he was "not a Sinn Féiner", but admitted to sympathy for the insurgents' cause, though he was opposed to violence.  He was then arrested and taken back to the Portobello Barracks in Rathmines (since renamed the Cathal Brugha Barracks).

Captain John Colthurst Bowen-Colthurst (1880-1965) was an officer of the reserve 3rd Battalion of Royal Irish Rifles and he belonged to an old Anglo-Irish and Protestant Ascendancy family with an extensive estate in County Cork.  His military career began in the Second Anglo-Boer War. Later, during an eight-year posting in India, he served with distinction as the head of a machine-gun unit with the 1904 Younghusband Tibet Expedition.  About 1905, Bowen-Colthurst became a Christian fundamentalist. At the start of World War I, he spent five weeks with the British Expeditionary Force on the Western Front (14 August-19 September, 1914), from which he had been sent home wounded and possibly shell-shocked. Bowen-Colthurst had had a brief mental breakdown during the Retreat from Mons and he had initiated a disastrous, premature attack at the Battle of Aisnes. Aside from his wounds, this behaviour perhaps ensured he was sent home from the front permanently. After a period of convalescence  and light duties, Bowen-Colthurst had been assigned in July 1915 to the Royal Irish Rifles at Portobello Barracks, where his primary duties were training and recruitment.

About 10:30 in the evening of April 25, Captain Bowen-Colthurst took Sheehy Skeffington back out of the barracks, as a hostage in a raiding party. The raid was aimed at the tobacconist shop of Alderman James Kelly, a moderate "home rule" nationalist, whom Bowen-Colthurst had mistaken for a separatist of the same name, Alderman Tom Kelly.

The raiding party consisted of an officer (Lieutenant Leslie Wilson) and 40 men led by Bowen-Colthurst, along with Sheehy Skeffington who had his hands tied behind his back. Before leaving the barracks, Bowen-Colthurst ordered Sheehy Skeffington to say his last prayers in case he might become a casualty, and when Sheehy Skefffington refused, Bowen-Colthurst said prayers on his behalf.  The troops left the barracks and headed towards Rathmines Road, where they encountered three young men loitering opposite the Church of Mary Immaculate, Refuge of Sinners. On the pretext of the lateness of the hour and that martial law had been proclaimed, Bowen-Colthurst detained and interrogated them. He then impetuously shot one of them: a 19-year-old mechanic named James Coade. Coade was initially left in the road but later that evening, picked up and taken to Portobello Barracks infirmary, where he died early the next morning without regaining consciousness. Sheehy Skeffington witnessed the shooting. (Lieutenant Wilson later testified at the subsequent Royal Commission that he did not hear Sheehy Skeffington make any protest about it.)  

The party continued down the Lower Rathmines Road, and the soldiers stopped at the Portobello Bridge, where half of the men were left at a guardhouse along with Sheehy Skeffington. Bowen-Colthurst gave orders that the soldiers at the guardhouse were to monitor the further progress of the raiding party, and shoot Sheehy Skeffington if either his or their party came under attack from snipers. The soldiers made their way three hundred yards along the road to Alderman James Kelly's shop (and home), which they stormed and destroyed with grenades.

They also captured two men who had taken refuge in the shop, Thomas Dickson and Patrick McIntyre, both  journalists. The two new captives and Sheehy Skeffington were then escorted back to Portobello Barracks where they were lodged in prison cells for the night.  Captain Bowen-Colthurst went to bed at three o'clock in the morning but stayed up till four, reading his Bible, focusing in particular on the verse from St Luke (19:27): "But these my enemies which will not have me reign over them, bring them forth and slay them."

Summary execution
Just after ten on the morning of April 26, Bowen-Colthurst came to the guardroom and ordered Dickson, McIntyre and Sheehy Skeffington taken out to an adjacent exercise yard. He announced his intentions to Lieutenant Dobbin, the subordinate officer in charge of the guardroom, telling him: "I am taking these prisoners out of the guard room [and] I am going to shoot them.  I think it is the right thing to do." He then assembled a squad of seven men in the yard and ordered them to fire immediately at the three prisoners, who until that moment were not aware they were about to die. After killing the three men, the firing squad immediately left the yard, but when movement was detected in Sheehy Skeffington's leg, Bowen-Colthurst ordered Lieutenant Dobbin to gather another group of four soldiers to fire another volley into him. About half an hour later, after informing the orderly room of his actions, Bowen-Colthurst reported what he had done to his superior, Major Rosborough. He said he took responsibility for the shooting and, aware that shooting prisoners was a capital offence, he also said that he "possibly might be hanged for it". Rosborough asked him for a written report, and later on, issued instructions that Bowen-Colthurst be limited to duties within the barracks.

Two hours later, while conducting a raid on a rebel hideout on Camden Street, Bowen-Colthurst shot two other men. One of them was Richard O'Carroll, a brick layer, trade union officer, Labour Party Councillor, and the Quartermaster of C Company of the Irish Volunteers. O'Carroll was delivering ammunition to the garrison outpost at Northumberland Road when he was pulled from his motorcycle and shot through the lungs. He died of his wounds nine days later. The other man was one Patrick Nolan, shot by Bowen-Colthurst outside Delahunt's Grocery shop on Camden Street. He was brought to the hospital at Dublin Castle and survived.

After the Portobello shootings, according to a letter from a 'Father Scannell' to Hanna Sheehy Skeffington many years later, Bowen-Colthurst made "frantic efforts to wipe out all the traces of his crime". Father Scannell alleged that Bowen-Colthurst detained several bricklayers from a nearby building site, and ordered them to repair the broken and bullet-impacted bricks in the wall behind where the executed men had stood. The terrified bricklayers had been surrounded by soldiers with fixed bayonets pointed at them.

Bowen-Colthurst's reports

Months later, when Countess Markievicz – then in Mountjoy Prison — first heard of the executions of the leaders of the Easter Rising, she expressed surprise at only one thing: "Why on earth did they shoot Skeffy?" she is reported to have said. "He didn't believe in fighting." Bowen-Colthurst himself provided an answer to this question in his report of April 26, the day of the shootings.  Part of his military operations report was as follows:

This morning at about 9 a.m. I proceeded to the Guard Room to examine these two men and I sent for them and for a man called Skeffongton [sic] who was also detained.  I had been busy on the previous evening up to about 3 a.m. examining documents found on these men and I recognised from these documents that the three men were all very dangerous characters.  I therefore sent for an armed guard of six men and ordered them to load their Rifles and keep their eyes on the prisoners.  The Guard Room was full of men and was not a suitable place in my opinion in which to examine the prisoners.  I ordered therefore the three prisoners to go into the small court yard of the Guard Room.  I regret that I did not have these men hand cuffed and surrounded as the yard was a place from which they might have escaped.  When I ordered these three men into the yard I did not however know this.  The Guard was some little distance from the prisoners and as I considered that there was a reasonable chance of the prisoners making their escape and knowing the three prisoners (from correspondence captured on them the previous evening ) to be dangerous characters, I called upon the Guard to fire upon them which they did with effect, the three men being killed.  The documents found on these three men have been forwarded to the orderly room.

On May 9, Bowen-Colthurst provided an account with a more anxious tone.  This was three days after his arrest and just before his arraignment on murder/manslaughter charges. The May 9 report in part read as follows:

On Tuesday and up to Wednesday morning rumours of massacres of police and soldiers from all parts of Dublin were being constantly sent to me from different sources. Among others the rumour reached me that 600 German prisoners at Oldcastle had been released and armed and were marching on Dublin. I also heard that the rebels in the city had opened up depots for the supply and issue of arms, and that a large force of rebels intended to attack Portobello Barracks, which was held only by a few troops ... We had also in the barracks a considerable number of officers and men who had been wounded by the rebels. ... Rumours of risings all over Ireland and of a large German-American and Irish-American landing in Galway were prevalent. ... I knew of the sedition which had been preached in Ireland for years past and of the popular sympathy with rebellion. I knew also that men on leave home from the trenches, although unarmed, had been shot like dogs in the streets of their own city, simply because they were in khaki, and I had also heard that wounded soldiers home for convalescence had been shot down also. On the Wednesday morning 26 April all this was in my mind. I was very much exhausted and unstrung after practically a sleepless night, and I took the gloomiest view of the situation and felt that only desperate measures would save the situation.  When I saw the position described in my previous report I felt I must act quickly, and believing I had the power under martial law, I felt, under the circumstances, that it was clearly my duty to have the ring-leaders shot.  It was a terrible ordeal for me, but I nerved myself to carry out what for me at the time a terrible duty.

There was another possible explanation for Colthurst's actions, mentioned in passing in the report of the subsequent Royal Commission [on the Arrest ... Sheehy Skeffington...Dickson...McIntyre].  This was the suggestion that "a shooting incident" [Coade's murder] at which "Sheehy Skeffington was present ... might have had some bearing upon his subsequent treatment."

Burial and coverup
When Bowen-Colthurst had informed him of the shootings, Rosborough asked the barracks adjutant to telephone both the Garrison Adjutant at Dublin Castle and HQ Irish Command. Shortly after, Dublin Castle sent instructions to wrap the men in sheets (coffins were in short supply) and bury them within the barracks. This was hastily done after Father O'Loughlin, the military chaplain, had performed the religious rites.
 
In an interview with the playwright Hayden Talbot six years after the killing, Hanna Sheehy Skeffington said her husband's body "had been put in a sack and buried in the barracks' yard. The remains were later given to his father on condition that the funeral would be at early morn and that I be not notified. My husband's father consented unwillingly to do this on the assurance of General Maxwell that obedience would result in the trial and punishment of the murderer." The bodies were reinterred at Glasnevin Cemetery on 8 May 1916.

Hanna Sheehy Skeffington was not told about her husband's detention or his death. She went around Dublin seeking to find where her husband was, and heard rumours of his fate. Her two sisters then offered to visit Portobello Barracks on Friday and make inquiries. Upon revealing their business, the two sisters were threatened with arrest as "Sinn Féiners", and questioned by Captain Bowen-Colthurst. Bowen-Colthurst denied any knowledge as to the fate of Francis Sheehy Skeffington, and had them escorted out of the barracks. Later on Friday Hanna learned the dreadful news from the father of James Coade, and the news was confirmed to her by the chaplain who had performed the funerary rites, and who also worked in the neighborhood.

On that same Friday evening, Bowen-Colthurst and a group of soldiers forced entry into the Sheehy Skeffingtons' home, hoping to find evidence to incriminate Francis as an enemy sympathiser. Hanna, Owen (then seven), and a "young maid-servant" were in the house, where Owen was just being put to bed. The soldiers announced their presence by firing a volley of bullets through the front windows. The soldiers then burst in through the front door, wielding rifles with fixed bayonets, and ordered the three residents to stand under guard while they searched the premises. According to an official report, "All the rooms in the house were thoroughly ransacked and a considerable quantity of books and papers were wrapped up in the household linen, placed in a passing motor car, and taken away. ... A large part of the material removed seems to have consisted of text-books both in German and other languages, as well as political papers and pamphlets belonging to Mr. Sheehy Skeffington." The maid-servant, terrified by the experience, subsequently quit her job. She was replaced by another maid who was subsequently arrested and detained for four days after another raid by the Portobello garrison (this time not ordered by Bowen-Colthurst). However, upon examination several months later by a government commission, none of the material was found to be seditious.

Sir Francis Vane
Major Francis Vane was in charge of Portobello Baracks defences at the outbreak of the Easter Rebellion.  At the time of the Portobello shootings, he had been setting up an observation post at the top of Rathmines Town Hall.  He returned to the barracks in the evening and was horrified to learn what had happened.  He stressed to Rosborough the critical importance of confining Bowen-Colthurst's activities to the barracks, and he delivered a stern lecture on martial law and its limitations to the barracks officers.

But Vane was an irritant to his military superiors. When Colonel McCammond, the Portobello Barracks commander, returned from sick leave on May 1, he removed responsibility for Portobello's defences from Vane and appointed Bowen-Colthurst in his stead.  Vane objected and then tried to arrange a meeting with General Maxwell at his HQ but had to content himself with talking to the Chief Intelligence Officer, Major Price.  Vane told Price about the events at Portobello but he was not happy with Price's response.

Court martial of Bowen-Colthurst
Vane then travelled to London and on 3 May he met the Secretary of State for War, Lord Kitchener, in Downing Street. A telegram was then sent to Sir John Maxwell, commander-in-chief of British forces in Ireland, ordering the arrest of Bowen-Colthurst. Bowen-Colthurst was preparing to conduct a 55-man detachment to Newry Barracks when the order came through (May 6) that he be placed under 'open' arrest. On May 11 he was placed under "close arrest".  Bowen-Colthurst was charged with murder, but to be tried by court-martial, despite the Army Act's stipulation that any soldier charged with murder committed in the United Kingdom could be tried only in a civilian, not a military, court.

Over a hundred spectators attended the court martial held June 6/7 at the Richmond Barracks, Dublin.  Once the prosecution and defence counsel had established the uncontested facts of the case, a succession of army officers testified to Bowen-Colthurst's kindness and decency but also to his occasional eccentricity, excitability and impulsiveness.  Major General Bird, Bowen-Colthurst's commander in the British Expeditionary Force, described his nervous breakdown during the Retreat from Mons.

Four expert medical witnesses agreed on Bowen-Colthurst's past (August,1914–April,1915) and current mental fragility, but they were less certain about his mental condition on the day of the shootings.  Dr Leeper testified that he could not give an opinion on Bowen-Colthurst's April 26 mental state because he had not been there at the time. The authors of the medical report, Captain Lawless and Major Purser, said that while it was impossible to say positively what Bowen-Colthurst's mental condition was on April 26, they had no doubt that at the present time he was mentally unsound.  Captain Lawless said that it was highly probable that Bowen-Colthurst's mental state on April 26 had been the same as his present condition, and he did not think that Bowen-Colthurst was responsible for his actions on that date. Major Purser concurred with this opinion.

Defence counsel argued that since the character witnesses had said that he was by nature kind and honourable, Bowen-Colthurst must have been insane when he executed the three prisoners, particularly in light of his past mental disturbances.  Except to enter his 'Not guilty' pleas and to decline to comment at the end of the proceedings, Bowen-Colthurst did not speak, as was his right.

There were doubts about the impartiality of the court martial.   There was no discussion of Bowen-Colthurst's April 26th report and no mention of Coade.   Similarly off limits were Bowen-Colthurst's activities in the hours and days following the executions—the murder of Richard O'Carroll in particular.  Important witnesses (Colonel McCammond, Lieutenants Tooley and Gibbon, Sergeant Claxton and others), who might have provided different views of Bowen-Colthurst's character and mental state, were not summoned to give evidence.  Most importantly, the medical evidence did not clearly establish Bowen-Colthurst's insanity at the time of the shootings, the standard of proof for insanity required by the Manual of Military Law.

At the culmination of his closing address, defence counsel made statements about Bowen-Colthurst's behaviour which turned out to be false. Hostage taking was not, in fact, unknown in the British army and Bowen-Colthurst was not firing his rifle wildly in the air on the way to Kelly's shop.  At the end of the trial, despite the weakness of the evidence for his insanity, Bowen-Colthurst was found 'Guilty but insane' and sentenced to indefinite incarceration in Broadmoor Asylum for the Criminally Insane.

The Royal Commission
The perverse verdict of the court martial, avoiding a sentence of death or imprisonment, became a cause célèbre internationally and, along with the civilian deaths in North King Street, provoked a political furore which culminated in the appointment of several Royal Commissions of Inquiry. The Royal Commission on the arrest and 'treatment' of Sheehy Skeffington, Dickson and McIntyre was chaired by Sir John Simon (a former Attorney General and Home Secretary), and held hearings on 23–31 August 1916 in a public courtroom at the Four Courts in Dublin. Thirty-eight witnesses were examined, including Sheehy Skeffington's wife Hanna. The report of this Commission
constitutes the principal source of facts about the events leading to the death of Sheehy Skeffington. However, much of the evidence presented at the oral hearings does not appear in the final report, but fortunately, it was published in the Dublin newspapers.

The Royal Commission examined the circumstances of Dickson's, McIntyre's and Sheehy Skeffington's deaths but not why they were killed.  The Commission chairman's view was that as a court martial had already determined that Bowen-Colthurst was insane, there could be no further discussion of his mental state and motives.  However, the Commission report did present a plausible narrative of Bowen-Colthurst's actions.

The evidence presented to the Commission was much the same as the testimony at the court martial.  But there were a number of disturbing revelations during the Commission  hearings, particularly those concerning  the shooting of James Coade and Bowen-Colthurst's raid on Kelly's.  First of all there was the actual murder of Coade.  Timothy Healy, counsel for the Sheehy Skeffington family, established that Sheehy Skeffington had witnessed Coade's killing.  Mr J. P. Brennan, solicitor for Patrick McIntyre, established that Sheehy Skeffington had had the opportunity to talk to Dickson and McIntyre  while they were being escorted back to Portobello Barracks.  However, the Commission reported that it was unable to arrive at any conclusions about a possible link between Coade's and Sheehy Skeffington's shootings.

The crucial court martial testimony of Lieutenant Leslie Wilson, who had accompanied Bowen-Colthurst on the raid on Kelly's, was shown to have been unreliable.  Wilson also told the commission panel that he thought it was quite legal to use Sheehy Skeffington as a hostage and did not consider the instruction to shoot him if Colthurst's party was fired on as 'strange'.  The Commission determined that Colthurst's April 26 report, which made no mention of Coade, was 'entirely untrue'.

The Commission also examined Bowen-Colthurst's second (May 9) report – more a justification of his actions than a military operations report such as he had previously written.  In his May 9 report, Bowen-Colthurst wrote of the precarious position of the undermanned Portobello Barracks, being threatened by rebel forces who might rescue the three rebel 'ringleaders' from the guard room.  Bowen-Colthurst then described his own precarious mental condition at the time as 'very much exhausted and unstrung after a practically sleepless night.'   He wrote that he believed he had the power under martial law to have the three prisoners shot, and he ended his report by describing the shootings as 'a terrible duty'.  The Commissioners dismissed his claim that the three men might escape from the guard room, and they addressed his (and others') misunderstanding of martial law in the conclusions of their report.

The Commission's report documented the raids on  Dickson's and Sheehy Skeffington's houses.  Rosborough authorised the first raid, on Dickson's house early in the evening of April 26.  Captain Murphy with two officers and 25 men conducted the operation.  Bowen-Colthurst took part in the second raid, nominally led by Colonel Allatt, on Sheehy Skeffington's house on the evening of April 28.  The Commission determined that this was the occasion Bowen-Colthurst found the allegedly incriminating document that he certified as being found on Sheehy Skeffington when he was arrested.  The Commission report characterized both raids as disreputable attempts to find evidence to justify the shootings after the fact.

An issue that was not discussed by the Commission panel was the shooting of Richard O'Carroll two hours after the shootings at Portobello.  Bowen-Colthurst described this briefly (without naming O'Carroll) in his April 26 report.  Sir John Simon stopped Healy from reading the relevant part of Bowen-Colthurst's report into the record (but not before Healy had identified O'Carroll as the victim), ruling that it was outside the terms of reference of the Commission. There were several such instances, on which lines of enquiry could not be pursued because of the Commission's narrow terms of reference.

Timothy Healy attempted to have Bowen-Colthurst brought to testify at the Commission hearings.  The Commissioners pointed out that he was confined in Broadmoor Criminal Lunatic Asylum and 'we have therefore felt ourselves debarred from taking his evidence'.

The Commission report concluded with three 'general observations'.  In the first, the Commission absolved Irish Command of responsibility for the murders, declaring itself 'satisfied that the state of things which rendered Captain Bowen-Colthurst's conduct possible was largely caused by the unfortunate but inevitable absence through serious illness of Colonel McCammond, the only officer in the barracks whom Captain Colthurst would not have considered himself at liberty to ignore.'

In its second observation, the report singled out Colthurst's April 28 raid on Mrs Sheehy Skeffington's house as being particularly discreditable, especially in the light of his earlier treatment of Mrs Sheehy Skeffington's sisters at Portobello Barracks.

The army authorities had been understandably nervous about Bowen-Colthurst's court martial and its ramifications.  The Manual of Military Law advocated the ruthless suppression  of insurrection and conditionally offered an 'Act of Indemnity' to any soldier for any illegal acts committed while martial law was in effect.     In its third observation, the Commissioners attempted to distance the army authorities from the apparent misapplication of martial law in Bowen-Colthurst's case.    Their report ascribed the complicity of the soldiers involved in Bowen-Colthurst's misconduct to a misunderstanding of martial law. The Commission report concluded with an admonition:

The effect, so far as the powers of military authorities are concerned, of a proclamation of martial law within the United Kingdom has often been expounded, but nevertheless, in the crisis which evokes such a proclamation, is not always remembered.  Such a proclamation does not, in itself, confer upon officers or soldiers any new powers.  It operates solely as a warning that the Government, acting through the military, is about to take such forcible and exceptional measures as may be necessary for the purpose of putting down insurrection and restoring order.... The shooting of unarmed and unresisting civilians without trial constitutes the offence of murder, whether martial law has been proclaimed or not. We should have deemed it superfluous to point this out were it not that the failure to realise and apply this elementary principle seems to explain the free hand which Captain Bowen-Colthurst was not restrained from exercising throughout the period of crisis.

Aftermath

Major Sir Francis Vane, who had sought to have Bowen-Colthurst brought to justice, was dishonourably discharged from the British Army in late May,1916, owing to an adverse report about him filed by British high commander Sir John Maxwell about his actions in the Skeffington murder case. He went on to be involved with the Boy Scouts, then retired from public life in 1927 and died in 1934.

Captain Bowen-Colthurst spent 19 months at Broadmoor Hospital but he did not change his views on how to deal with suspected rebels. He was released under medical supervision on 26 January 1918 and provided with a military pension. Bowen-Colthurst emigrated in April 1919 to the Canadian province of British Columbia, where he lived for the rest of his life and died in 1965. His obituary did not mention his role in the Easter rising. His remains were buried in Lakeview Cemetery in Penticton, British Columbia.

Hanna Sheehy Skeffington was offered financial compensation by the British government in 1916, but she refused it because it came on the condition that she cease to speak and write about the murder. She became increasingly nationalist-minded, and supported the Anti-Treaty IRA during the Irish Civil War. She refused to send her son Owen to any school with a pro-Treaty ethos, and therefore opted to place him in the secular Sandford Park School when it was founded in 1922. Her sister's son Conor Cruise O'Brien was also placed there. Hanna died in 1946.

Owen Sheehy-Skeffington became a lecturer in French at Trinity College, and, beginning in 1954, an Irish Senator. He died in 1970.

See also
 List of peace activists

Works

Books
A Forgotten Aspect of the University Question.  Privately printed, Dublin 1901 (published with The Day of the Rabblement by James Joyce.)
Michael Davitt, revolutionary, agitator and labour leader, 1908 (accessible from Internet Archive).
 
 In Dark and Evil Days, Dublin : J. Duffy, 1916.

Personal papers
The personal papers of Francis Sheehy Skeffington and his wife Hanna were donated to the National Library of Ireland. Details of the papers can be accessed online.

References

External links
 Biography

1878 births
1916 deaths
Alumni of University College Dublin
Auditors of the Literary and Historical Society (University College Dublin)
World War I crimes by the British Empire and Commonwealth
Irish pacifists
Irish suffragists
Irish anti–World War I activists
Irish atheists
People from County Cavan
Burials at Glasnevin Cemetery
Extrajudicial killings
Male feminists
Pacifist feminists
Irish Esperantists
Irish Citizen Army members
19th-century atheists
20th-century atheists